The 1994 Toray Pan Pacific Open was a tennis tournament played on indoor carpet courts at the Tokyo Metropolitan Gymnasium in Tokyo in Japan that was part of Tier I of the 1994 WTA Tour. It was the 19th edition of the tournament and was held from January 31 through February 6, 1994.

Finals

Singles

 Steffi Graf defeated  Martina Navratilova 6–2, 6–4
 It was Graf's 2nd title of the year and the 92nd of her career.

Doubles

 Pam Shriver /  Elizabeth Smylie defeated  Manon Bollegraf /  Martina Navratilova 6–3, 3–6, 7–6
 It was Shriver's 1st title of the year and the 132nd of her career. It was Smylie's 1st title of the year and the 36th of her career.

External links
 Official website 
 Official website 
 WTA Tournament Profile

Toray Pan Pacific Open
Pan Pacific Open
Toray Pan Pacific Open
Toray Pan Pacific Open
Toray Pan Pacific Open
Toray Pan Pacific Open
1994 Toray Pan Pacific Open